Kani Chay (also Romanized as Kānī Chāy; also known as Kānī Chā’ī) is a village in Yalghuz Aghaj Rural District, Serishabad District, Qorveh County, Kurdistan Province, Iran. At the 2006 census, its population was 107, in 26 families. The village is populated by Kurds.

References 

Towns and villages in Qorveh County
Kurdish settlements in Kurdistan Province